David Leonard Woodhead (born 17 March 1940) is an English former first-class cricketer.

Woodhead was born at Moseley in March 1940. He later studied at Fitzwilliam College at the University of Cambridge. While studying at Cambridge, he played first-class cricket for Cambridge University in 1968, making seven appearances. He scored 168 runs in his seven matches, at an average of 15.50 and with a high score of 68. He also bowled 41 overs of leg spin, but did not take any wickets. In addition to playing first-class cricket for Cambridge, Woodhead also made a single appearance for a combined Oxford and Cambridge Universities cricket team against the touring Australians at Fenner's in 1968.

References

External links

1940 births
Living people
People from Moseley
Alumni of Fitzwilliam College, Cambridge
English cricketers
Cambridge University cricketers
Oxford and Cambridge Universities cricketers